KAMG-LP (92.1 FM) was a low-power FM radio station licensed to Enid, Oklahoma. The station was last owned by Maranatha Radio Corporation.

History
The Federal Communications Commission (FCC) issued a construction permit for the station to Central Assembly of God Church on February 27, 2004. The station was assigned the KAMG-LP call sign on May 13, 2004. On November 1, 2005, the construction permit was assigned to Amigos Ministry, and the station was granted its license to cover on February 27, 2007.

The station's license was assigned for no consideration to Maranatha Radio Corporation effective February 28, 2011.

Maranatha Radio Corporation surrendered KAMG-LP's license to the FCC on February 27, 2021, and the license was cancelled on March 1, 2021.

References

External links
 

Radio stations established in 2007
AMG-LP
AMG-LP
Radio stations disestablished in 2021
Defunct radio stations in the United States
AMG-LP
Defunct religious radio stations in the United States
2007 establishments in Oklahoma
2021 disestablishments in Oklahoma